Manga+ is the re-released version of the first, self-titled album of Turkish rock band Manga, released in 2006 by Sony Music/GRGDN. Two new songs were added to it, along with a special DVD.

Track listing
Açılış (Intro)  – 1:18
Kandırma Kendini (Don't fool yourself) - 3:59
Raptiye Rap Rap - 4:14
Kapkaç (Robbery)  – 2:51
Bitti Rüya (The dream has ended)(Guest vocal : Göksel Demirpençe)  – 3:59
Bir Kadın Çizeceksin (You'll draw a woman)  – 3:59
Kal Yanımda (Stay beside me)(Guest vocal: Koray Candemir)  – 3:45
Yalan (Lie)  – 5:27
Libido (Libido)  – 3:02
İz Bırakanlar Unutulmaz (Those leaving marks aren't forgotten)(Guest vocal: Vega)  – 4:10
Sakın Bana Söyleme (Don't you dare tell me)  – 4:39
Dursun Zaman (Time should stop) (Guest vocal: Göksel)  – 4:50
Mangara  – 2:27
İtildik (We were pushed away) – 3:25
Yalan 2 (Lie 2) (Backing vocal: Koray Candemir) – 3:57
Kapanış (Closing)  – 1:07

 Hidden track: "Yalan 2" featuring Unknown MC after "Kapanış".

Extras

The album contains the audio cd with the above track listing, and a special DVD, containing the four music videos of the band with a specially designed manga-style DVD-menu:

 Bir Kadın Çizeceksin (director: Cynosure)
 Bitti Rüya (director: Devrin Usta)
 Dursun Zaman (director: Onur Uysal)
 Kandırma Kendini (director: Devrin Usta)

Album information

Personnel

 Management: Hadi Elazzi, Selim Serezli
 Producer: Haluk Kurosman
 Assistant Producer: Yağmur Sarıgül
 Arrangement: Haluk Kurosman and maNga
 Studio: GRGDN - ULUS
 Editing, Mixing, Mastering: Haluk Kurosman
 Recording assistant: Özgür Salur (Kandırma Kendini)
 Design:
 Manga drawings: Kaan Demirçelik 
 Graphics: Emrah Gündüz
 Photography: Şafak Taner

Featuring musicians

 Keyboard,  Electronic underworks: Haluk Kurosman
 Vocal, Kal Yanımda and Yalan 2: Koray Candemir
 Vocal, İz Bırakanlar Unutulmaz: Deniz Özbey Akyüz (Vega)
 Vocal, Dursun Zaman: Göksel
 Vocal, Kal Yanımda 2: Unknown MC
 Ney in Açılış, Kapanış: Ali Sarıgül
 Piano in Yalan, İtildik: Özgür Sarı
 Sound Recording for Kapkaç, Yalan: Emel Çölgeçen
 Stringed instruments (Kandırma Kendini): Kempa Yaylı Grubu

Bitti Rüya, Bir Kadın Çizeceksin, Sakın Bana Söyleme:

 Tülay Karşın: Violin
 Kerem Berkalp: Violin
 Göknil Özkök Genç: Viola
 Didem Erken: Cello

External links
 maNga official site (TR) (EN)
 maNga international fanclub
 Song lyrics in English
 GRGDN official site
 
 Album rating at Californian KZSU Radio

2006 albums
Albums produced by Haluk Kurosman
Manga (band) albums